Antoine Saout (born 26 June 1984) is a French professional poker player who made the November Nine in the 2009 World Series of Poker finishing 3rd.

In April 2007, Antoine Saout began playing poker online under the pseudonym "tonio292" while studying at the National School of Information Technology. He turned full-time professional a year and a half later. In late 2008, Saout switched his focus to live poker qualifying for several tournaments including the World Series of Poker through Everest Poker.

In July 2009, Saout reached the final table in the 2009 World Series of Poker Main Event.  Three months later, he finished 7th for £114,228 in the WSOPE Main Event and then finished 3rd in the 2009 WSOP Main Event, winning an additional $3,479,485 in the process. With three players remaining he called Joe Cada's short stack all in with  against Cada's . The board came  giving Cada three of a kind and leaving Saout with a short chip stack. Saout was later eliminated after moving all in for his remain stack with  again against Cada who held . Cada hit a king on the river card to eliminate Saout.

In 2017, Saout was part of the November Nine, making his 2nd main event final table since 2009.

As of 2017, Anoine Saout's live tournament winnings exceed $7,550,000. This ranks Saout third on France's all time money list.

References

External links
PokerNews profile

1984 births
French poker players
People from Morlaix
Living people
Sportspeople from Finistère